Brandy Zdan is a Canadian musician, songwriter, multi-instrumentalist and record producer based in Nashville, TN. Zdan writes in the rock, indie-rock genre and has been compared to artists like Joan Jett and Susie Quattro with her energetic and engaging stage presence and live show.

Early life 
Zdan was raised in Winnipeg, Manitoba where she started playing her own songs in local coffee shops at the age of 15.

Career 
Twilight Hotel
In the 2010s, Zdan was a member of the Juno nominated gothic-americana duo Twilight Hotel, based in Winnipeg, Manitoba. They released three studio albums, 2006’s Bethune, 2008’s Highway Prayer, produced by Colin Linden, earning them a Juno nomination for Best Roots Album (Duo/Group). In 2012, they released When the Wolves Go Blind also earning them a second Juno nomination for Best Roots Album (Duo/ Group). After a move to Austin, TX the group disbanded.

In 2011, Zdan joined Texas super-group, The Trishas, as their multi-instrumentalist playing guitar, steel and accordion until 2014 when she relocated to Nashville, TN.

Solo career
Zdan released her self-titled album in November 2015, produced by Teddy Morgan and featuring members of My Morning Jacket, Carl Broemal and Tom Blankenship. On May 11, 2018, Zdan released her second album, Secretear, on Tallest Man Records which was featured in Relix and Guitar World.  Rolling Stone named her “a guitar hero of the highest order." Zdan has toured all over North America, the UK and Europe and has opened for notable acts as Buddy Guy, The Romantics, Doyle Bramhall II, Will Hoge, Aaron Lee Tasjan and more. Zdan is a Fender and Gibson endorsed artist.

Record production 
 2017, Zdan co-produced her album, Secretear.
 2019, Zdan produced and sang on, "Ok, I Feel Better Now" by Nashville indie rock artist, Kelley Hoppenjans.

Discography 
Solo albums
 Lone Hunter EP, 2013
 Heart Theft, Instrumentals 1, 2014
 Brandy Zdan, Self titled, 2015
 Secretear, 2018

Singles
 2018- Wild Fire (LIVE)
 2019- I Wanna Dance With Somebody ( Who loves Me)

Albums with Twilight Hotel
 Bethune, 2006
 Highway Prayer, 2008
 When the Wolves go Blind, 2012

Album production credits
 2018, Secretear, Brandy Zdan
 2019, Ok, I Feel better now, Kelly Hoppenjans

Song and musician credits 
2015

 Kevin Costner & Modern West / Where the Music Takes You 
 Background Vocals
 Josh Taerk/ Here’s to Change
 Background Vocals

2017

 Drew Kennedy / At Home in the Big Lonesome
 Background Vocals

2018

 Jamie Freeman / Dreams about Falling
Songwriter/ Background Vocals
 No Dry Country / Panhandle Music
Background Vocals
 Johnny Chops & the Razors / Self- Titled
Background Vocals

Film and television placements 
 “People Like Us” 1 Mile to You Film Soundtrack (2016)
 “Only the Sad Songs” MTV’s Awkward (2016)
 “More of a Man” MTV’s Awkward (2016)
“Wild Fire” Freeform Network’s Good Trouble (2018)
 ‘Wild Fire”  CW Network’s Charmed (2018)
 “Get To You” & “ I Want Your Trouble” Netflix’s Terrace House (Japan) (2018)
 “Living is a Sin” CW Network’s In The Dark (2018)

References

Year of birth missing (living people)
Living people
Canadian multi-instrumentalists
Canadian women rock singers
Canadian women singer-songwriters
Canadian women record producers
Musicians from Winnipeg
21st-century Canadian women singers